Gyropena minuta, also known as the Mount Gower pinwheel snail, is a species of air-breathing land snail, a terrestrial pulmonate gastropod mollusc in the pinwheel snail family, that is endemic to Australia's Lord Howe Island in the Tasman Sea.

Description
The shell of the snail is 0.9 mm in height, with a diameter of 1.9 mm. The colour is golden-brown. The shape is discoidal with a low spire, shouldered whorls, impressed sutures, and with prominent, moderately widely-spaced radial ribs. The umbilicus is widely open. The aperture is roundly lunate. The animal is unknown.

Distribution and habitat
This rare snail is found at the southern end of the island on the summits and slopes of Mount Lidgbird and Mount Gower, inhabiting plant litter.

References

 
 

 
minuta
Gastropods of Lord Howe Island
Gastropods described in 2010